Trabelsi is a Maghrebi Arabic surname, deriving from the city of Tripoli in Libya. Notable people with the surname include:

Bahaa Trabelsi, Moroccan novelist
Belhassen Trabelsi (born 1962), Tunisian businessman
Hatem Trabelsi (born 1977), Tunisian footballer
Imed Trabelsi (born 1974), Tunisian businessman
Leïla Ben Ali, née Leila Trabelsi, former First Lady of Tunisia
Mohamed Trabelsi (born 1968), Tunisian footballer
Nizar Trabelsi (born 1970), Tunisian footballer
Sabeur Trabelsi (born 1984), Tunisian footballer
Sami Trabelsi (born 1968), Tunisian footballer

Arabic-language surnames